Acantholimon (prickly thrift) is a genus of small flowering plants within the plumbago or leadwort family, Plumbaginaceae. They are distributed from southeastern Europe to central Asia and also in South America, but also cultivated elsewhere in rock gardens.

Form
The evergreen subshrubs are generally cushion to mat-forming, with densely tufted shoots bearing mostly awl (long, pointed spike) to needle or grass-like, prickle to spine-tipped hard-textured leaves. They have shortish, simple or branched flower stems which can be loose or dense. The summer-borne flowers are composed of a funnel-shaped calyx, usually with a flared membranous margin, and five spreading petals.

Species

There are over 400 species.

Selected species of Acantholimon include:
Acantholimon acerosum
Acantholimon albertii
Acantholimon anatolicum
Acantholimon armenum
Acantholimon artosense
Acantholimon avenaceum
Acantholimon bashkaleicum
Acantholimon birandii
Acantholimon calvertii
Acantholimon capitatum
Acantholimon davisii
Acantholimon doganii
Acantholimon gabrieljaniae
Acantholimon gillii
Acantholimon glumaceum
Acantholimon goeksunicum
Acantholimon hoshapicum
Acantholimon ibrahimii
Acantholimon karamanicum
Acantholimon koeycegizicum
Acantholimon kotschyi
Acantholimon libanoticum
Acantholimon riyatguelii
Acantholimon schemachense
Acantholimon turcicum
Acantholimon ulicinum
Acantholimon vedicum
Acantholimon venustum
Acantholimon yildizelicum

References

 
Caryophyllales genera
Taxa named by Pierre Edmond Boissier